Simon Kaurin Slåttvik (24 July 1917 – 7 May 2001) was a Norwegian skier. He competed at the 1952 Winter Olympics in the Nordic combined and 18 km cross-country skiing and won the gold medal in the former event. Earlier he won a Nordic combined bronze medal at the 1950 World Championships. He won 14 Norwegian titles and was the first Nordic combined athlete to jump over 100 m. Slåttvik won the Nordic combined event at the Holmenkollen ski festival in 1948, 1950 and 1951, and was awarded the Holmenkollen medal in 1951.

Slåttvik started competing in Nordic events aged 15. His career was delayed by World War II and peaked around 1950, when he was already in his thirties. After the 1952 Olympics he won a national title in 1953, placed fifth at the 1954 World Championships, and remained active through the late 1950s. Slåttvik was known for his relatively mild training regime, and would often smoke after a race. In the early 1950s he moved to Lillehammer, married and had two sons. He named one of them Heikki after his Finnish friend and long-term rival Heikki Hasu.

Cross-country skiing results

Olympic Games

World Championships

References

External links

 
 Holmenkollen medalists – click Holmenkollmedaljen for downloadable pdf file 
 Holmenkollen winners since 1892 – click Vinnere for downloadable pdf file 

1917 births
2001 deaths
Norwegian male Nordic combined skiers
Norwegian male cross-country skiers
Olympic Nordic combined skiers of Norway
Olympic cross-country skiers of Norway
Cross-country skiers at the 1952 Winter Olympics
Nordic combined skiers at the 1952 Winter Olympics
Olympic gold medalists for Norway
Holmenkollen medalists
Holmenkollen Ski Festival winners
Olympic medalists in Nordic combined
FIS Nordic World Ski Championships medalists in Nordic combined
Medalists at the 1952 Winter Olympics
People from Fauske
Sportspeople from Nordland